Dean v. Utica Community Schools, 345 F. Supp. 2d 799 (E.D. Mich. 2004), is a landmark legal case in United States constitutional law, namely on how the First Amendment applies to censorship in a public school environment. The case expanded on the ruling definitions of the Supreme Court case Hazelwood School District v. Kuhlmeier, in which a high school journalism-oriented trial on censorship limited the First Amendment right to freedom of expression in curricular student newspapers.  The case consisted of Utica High School Principal Richard Machesky ordering the deletion of an article in the Arrow, the high school's newspaper, a decision later deemed "unreasonable" and "unconstitutional" by District Judge Arthur Tarnow.

Case overview

On March 8, 2002, Utica High School Principal Richard Machesky asked the Arrow advisor to cut student reporter Katy Dean's story about school bus diesel emissions along with the adjoining cartoon and editorial, at the time claiming it was based on "unreliable" sources and was "highly inaccurate." After a year of asking school officials to reconsider their decision, Dean filed a lawsuit against the Utica Community Schools in federal court.

On October 12, 2004, Judge Arthur Tarnow determined that "The Arrow" student newspaper was an example of a limited public forum after reviewing the degree of control school officials exercised over the paper, which ultimately separated this case from the decision expressed in Hazelwood. A limited public forum—in this context, a public forum created for use by student editors—can reasonably be regulated in terms of time, place, and manner of expression, but not on the substance of that expression. 

Tarnow also examined Dean's article and determined that there was not a "significant disparity in quality between Dean's article in the Arrow and the similar articles in 'professional newspapers.'" In addition to these two factors, the Judge decided that the school had censored the article in its own interest, by preventing the expression of its viewpoint, and then claiming it was "inaccurate."

See also
 Environmental journalism
 Tinker v. Des Moines
 Bethel v. Fraser
 Hazelwood School District v. Kuhlmeier

References

External links
 
National Scholastic Press Association:  Dean v. Utica FAQ

United States Free Speech Clause case law
United States District Court for the Eastern District of Michigan cases
2004 in United States case law
2004 in education
2004 in Michigan
Education in Macomb County, Michigan
Air pollution in the United States
High school newspapers published in the United States
Student newspapers published in Michigan
Student rights case law in the United States